Dr. Meriwether Lewis Anderson (June 23, 1805 - March 5, 1862) was a prominent Virginia physician and politician.

Anderson was born at "Locust Hill" in Albemarle County, Virginia to Edmund Anderson and Jane Meriwether Lewis, the sister of Meriwether Lewis.  He graduated from the University of Virginia and went on to get a degree in medicine from the University of Pennsylvania School of Medicine.  After qualifying as a physician he moved to Mississippi to begin his practice and take up farming. Anderson returned to Virginia in 1837 upon inheriting his maternal grandmother's estate and became a well known and respected physician of the Piedmont region.  His prominence in Albemarle county resulted in his election to the Virginia Legislature in 1861. Anderson died several months after his election in 1862.

Anderson married Lucy Sydnor Harper (1811–1885) in 1831; the daughter of Charles and Lucy Smither Harper. The couple had five children including Meriwether Lewis Anderson, Jr who was killed at the Battle of Fisher's Hill in 1864. The Andersons also adopted several nieces and nephews in addition to their own.

Locust Hill
Anderson was born at Locust Hill the home of his grandmother Lucy Meriwether Lewis. The estate was acquired in 1730 by his great-grandfather Col. Robert Lewis.  Anderson had spent most of his life at Locust Hill in part due to his fathers inadequacies in business. He inherited the property on the death of his grandmother in 1837 shortly after which the main house burned down. Anderson is responsible for the current house which stands at Locust Hill today. The estate is also the birthplace of his uncle Meriwether Lewis.

References

 Adams, William Howard, The Eye of Thomas Jefferson, Thomas Jefferson Memorial Foundation, Charlottesville, VA, 1992.
 Minor, Louisa H. A., The Meriwethers and their Connections: A family record, giving the genealogy of the Meriwethers in America together with biographical notes and sketches, J. Munsell's sons, Albany N.Y., 1892.
 Tyler, Lyon Gardner, Encyclopedia of Virginia Biography, Under the Editorial Supervision of Lyon Gardiner Tyler, Vol. 4., Lewis Historical Publishing Company, New York, 1915.
 Woods, Edgar, Albemarle County in Virginia: giving some account of what it was by nature, of what it was made by man, and of some of the men who made it, The Michie company, Charlottesville, VA, 1901.

Ancestry

Footnotes

1805 births
1862 deaths
People from Albemarle County, Virginia
Physicians from Virginia
Members of the Virginia General Assembly
University of Virginia alumni
Perelman School of Medicine at the University of Pennsylvania alumni
Lewis family
19th-century American politicians